Dario Kolobarić (born 6 February 2000) is a Slovenian professional footballer who plays as a forward for Gorica.

Career
In 2016, Kolobarić joined the youth academy of Red Bull Salzburg from Domžale.

Before the second half of the 2019–20 season, Domžale sent him on loan to Dob in the Slovenian second division.

On 3 September 2021, Kolobarić joined Belarusian Premier League team Shakhtyor Soligorsk for an undisclosed fee.

References

External links
 
 
 Dario Kolobarić at NZS 

Living people
2000 births
People from Teslić
Slovenian footballers
Slovenia youth international footballers
Slovenia under-21 international footballers
Association football forwards
NK Domžale players
NK Dob players
FC Shakhtyor Soligorsk players
FC Koper players
ND Gorica players
Slovenian PrvaLiga players
Slovenian Second League players
Belarusian Premier League players
Slovenian expatriate footballers
Slovenian expatriate sportspeople in Austria
Expatriate footballers in Austria
Slovenian expatriate sportspeople in Belarus
Expatriate footballers in Belarus
Slovenian people of Bosnia and Herzegovina descent